The Latvia men's national volleyball team represents Latvia in international men's volleyball competitions and friendly matches. It is governed by the Latvian Volleyball Federation and takes part in international volleyball competitions.

The team was formed shortly after regaining full independence in 1991. The biggest achievement of the national team until 2020 was the qualification for the group stage of the 1995 Men's European Volleyball Championship in Greece.

In September 2020, the team qualified for the 2021 Men's European Volleyball Championship after beating Cyprus 3-0 and claiming the top spot in Qualifying Pool D, which came after a 26-year-long absence from the European championships.

Results

European Championship
 Champions   Runners up   Third place   Fourth place

World League / Nations League
 Champions   Runners up   Third place   Fourth place

From 2018, the World League was replaced by the Nations League.

European League
 Champions   Runners up   Third place   Fourth place

Kit suppliers

Current squad
This is the roster of the Latvian team for the 2019 CEV Volleyball European Golden League.

Head Coach:  Avo Keel

Other squads
 Men's
 Men's Junior U-20
The men's junior team participated in the 2012 CEV Junior Volleyball European Championship.
 Men's U-18

References

External links
 Nacionālā izlase (Men's National Team) - Latvijas Volejbola Federācija (Latvian)

Volleyball
National men's volleyball teams
Volleyball in Latvia
Men's sport in Latvia